Dark Forces is a 2020 Mexican film directed and written by Bernardo Arellano and starring Mauricio Aspe, Johana Fragoso Blendl and Dale Carley.

Cast 
 Mauricio Aspe as Max
 Johana Fragoso Blendl as Julia
 Dale Carley as Jack
 Ángel Garnica as Botones
 Tenoch Huerta as Franco
 Eréndira Ibarra as Rubí
 Eglé Ivanauskaité as Molly
 Daina Soledad Liparoti as Diva
 Ariane Pellicer as Helga
 Pedro Prieto as Hombre de negro
 Marina Vera as Recepcionista
 Nick Zedd as Demonio

Release
Dark Forces was released on August 21, 2020 on Netflix.

References

External links
 
 

2020 films
2020s Spanish-language films
Spanish-language Netflix original films
2020s Mexican films